The Duluth Air Defense Sector (DUADS) is an inactive United States Air Force organization.  Its last assignment was with the Air Defense Command 29th Air Division, being stationed at Duluth Airport, Minnesota.  It was inactivated on 1 April 1969.

History
Established in October 1957 assuming control of former ADC Central Air Defense Force units with a mission to provide air defense of most of Minnesota and western Wisconsin.  The organization provided command and control over several aircraft and radar squadrons.

In November 1959, the new Semi Automatic Ground Environment (SAGE) Direction Center (DC-10) became operational.   DC-10 was equipped with dual AN/FSQ-7 Computers.   The day-to-day operations of the command was to train and maintain tactical flying units flying jet interceptor aircraft (F-94 Starfire; F-102 Delta Dagger; F-106 Delta Dart) in a state of readiness with training missions and series of exercises with SAC and other units simulating interceptions of incoming enemy aircraft.

In October 1962, during the Cuban Missile Crisis, a guard at the Direction Center mistakenly identified a bear trying to climb the security fence as a saboteur and rang the alarm, which automatically triggered similar alarms at other bases in the region. A faulty alarm system at Volk Field in Wisconsin led to nuclear-armed interceptor aircraft nearly being launched. 

Inactivated April 1966 as part of ADC reorganization and consolidation, the command being redesignated as the 29th Air Division. The SAGE building was remodeled and, in 1985, given to the University of Minnesota Duluth to house the Natural Resources Research Institute signed into legislation to address the struggling economy during the early 1980s recession.

Lineage
 Established as Duluth Air Defense Sector on 1 October 1957, Inactivated on 1 April 1966

Assignments
 37th Air Division, 1 October 1957
 31st Air Division, 20 December 1957
 37th Air Division, 1 January 1959
 30th Air Division, 1 April 1959 – 1 April 1966

Stations
 Duluth Airport, Minnesota, 1 October 1957 – 1 April 1966

Components

Wings
 56th Fighter Wing (Air Defense): K. I. Sawyer AFB, Michigan, 1 October 1963-1 January 1964
 507th Fighter Wing (Air Defense): Kincheloe AFB, Michigan, 1 October 1963-1 April 1966

Group
 343d Fighter Group (Air Defense): Duluth Airport, Minnesota, 15 November 1959-1 April 1966

Interceptor squadrons
 18th Fighter-Interceptor Squadron: Grand Forks AFB, North Dakota, 4 September 1963-1 April 1966
 62d Fighter-Interceptor Squadron: K. I. Sawyer AFB, Michigan, 16 December 1963-1 April 1966

Missile squadrons
 37th Air Defense Missile Squadron (BOMARC): Kincheloe AFB, Michigan, 1 October 1963-1 April 1966
 74th Air Defense Missile Squadron (BOMARC): Duluth AF Missile Site, Minnesota, 1 April 1960-1 April 1966

Radar squadrons

 665th Radar Squadron: Calumet AFS, Michigan, 1 October 1963-1 April 1966
 674th Radar Squadron: Osceola AFS, Wisconsin, 1 July 1959-1 April 1966
 676th Radar Squadron: Antigo AFS, Wisconsin, 1 October 1963-1 June 1964
 692d Radar Squadron: Baudette AFS, Minnesota, 1 July 1959-1 April 1966
 707th Radar Squadron: Grand Rapids AFS, Minnesota, 1 July 1959-1 August 1963
 739th Radar Squadron: Wadena AFS, Minnesota, 4 September 1963-1 April 1966

 753d Radar Squadron: Sault Sainte Marie AFS, Michigan, 1 October 1963-1 April 1966
 756th Radar Squadron: Finland AFS, Minnesota, 1 July 1959-1 April 1966
 785th Radar Squadron: Finley AFS, North Dakota, 4 September 1963-1 April 1966
 914th Aircraft Control and Warning Squadron: Armstrong AS, Ontario, 15 November 1959-1 November 1962 
 915th Aircraft Control and Warning Squadron: Sioux Lookout AS, Ontario, 15 November 1959-1 October 1962

See also
 List of USAF Aerospace Defense Command General Surveillance Radar Stations
 List of United States Air Force aircraft control and warning squadrons
 Aerospace Defense Command Fighter Squadrons

References

  A Handbook of Aerospace Defense Organization 1946 - 1980,  by Lloyd H. Cornett and Mildred W. Johnson, Office of History, Aerospace Defense Center, Peterson Air Force Base, Colorado
 Winkler, David F. (1997), Searching the skies: the legacy of the United States Cold War defense radar program. Prepared for United States Air Force Headquarters Air Combat Command.
 Maurer, Maurer (1983). Air Force Combat Units Of World War II. Maxwell AFB, Alabama: Office of Air Force History. .
 Ravenstein, Charles A. (1984). Air Force Combat Wings Lineage and Honors Histories 1947–1977. Maxwell AFB, Alabama: Office of Air Force History. .
 Radomes.org Duluth Air Defense Sector

1959 establishments in Minnesota
1966 disestablishments in Minnesota
Air Defense
Military units and formations in Minnesota